Sheldon Oliensis (March 19, 1922 – May 14, 2001) was a New York City lawyer, a president of the Legal Aid Society, and a president of the New York City Bar Association.

Early life and education

Sheldon Oliensis was born in Philadelphia on March 19, 1922. He attended the University of Pennsylvania and Harvard Law School, where he was president of the Harvard Law Review.

Career

After a period of practice with another firm, Oliensis joined Kaye Scholer in 1960 as a litigation partner.

In addition to his private practice, Oliensis was highly involved in public service. He was a longtime member of the New York City Bar Association, where he chaired a number of committees, including the Grievance Committee, the Executive Committee and the Committee on Access to Legal Services. He served a president of the Bar from 1988 to 1990, and he was instrumental in establishing Volunteers of Legal Service (VOLS), the Bar's pro bono legal service organization.

He was also a president of the Legal Aid Society from 1973 to 1975, was chair of the New York City Conflict of Interest Board, a director of the Fund for Modern Courts, and a director of the East Harlem Tutorial Program.

Death

Sheldon Oliensis died of cancer at his home in Manhattan on May 14, 2001. He was 79 years old.

Sources

 Morris, Jeffrey B. "Making Sure We are True to Our Founders": The Association of the Bar of the City of New York, 1980-1995. New York, NY: Fordham University Press, 1997. 
“Sheldon Oliensis, Former Bar Association Head; 79.” The New York Times. May 15, 2001.

1922 births
2001 deaths
Lawyers from Philadelphia
University of Pennsylvania alumni
Harvard Law School alumni
New York (state) lawyers
Presidents of the New York City Bar Association
Kaye Scholer partners
People from Manhattan
20th-century American lawyers